The Eurovision Young Musicians 2016 was the eighteenth edition of the Eurovision Young Musicians contest, which took place on 3 September 2016, outside the Cologne Cathedral, in Cologne, Germany. For a second consecutive time, German public broadcaster Westdeutscher Rundfunk (WDR) was the host broadcaster for the event, with Daniel Hope and Tamina Kallert being the presenters for the show. The candidates were accompanied by the WDR Symphony Orchestra Cologne, conducted by Clemens Schuldt. A five-person jury decided which of the participants would be awarded with the top-three prizes. Łukasz Dyczko of Poland won the contest, with Czech Republic and Austria placing second and third respectively.

Location

Bidding phase
Two cities were interested in hosting the 2016 edition of the Eurovision Young Musicians, Budapest and Cologne. Following the bid presentations to the contest's Steering Group members, representatives of Norwegian broadcaster Norwegian Broadcasting Corporation (NRK), Dutch broadcaster Omroep NTR (NTR) and Slovenian broadcaster Radiotelevizija Slovenija (RTVSLO) decided to award the hosting of the 2016 contest to Cologne and the German broadcaster Westdeutscher Rundfunk (WDR).

Host city announcement

It was announced on 9 December 2014, that the 2016 contest would take place at the Cologne Cathedral in Cologne, Germany on 3 September 2016. This was the second consecutive time that the German city had hosted the Young Musicians, with the last being the Eurovision Young Musicians 2014. This was the sixth time that the competition was held on an open-air stage. It was also the third time that Germany had been the host nation, with their first in Berlin for the Eurovision Young Musicians 2002.

Format
Each of the eleven participants performed a piece of up to six minutes in length, which was judged by a five-person professional jury. Each of the jurors commented on the performances after each participant had finished their piece, adding to the interaction during the show. After all of the performances, the jury then awarded points to each participant, with the total scores being used to decide the winner. Prizes were awarded to the first, second, and third placed participants. WDR Symphony Orchestra Cologne, conducted by Clemens Schuldt, accompanied each of the eleven the participating musicians during their performances.

Presenters 

On 28 April 2016 it was announced by the EBU and host broadcaster WDR that Daniel Hope and Tamina Kallert would be the presenters for the eighteenth edition of the Young Musicians contest. Hope is better known as a British classical violinist who is of German descent, won the prize for young British classical performer of the year at the Classical BRIT awards in 2004. and more recently was awarded the 2015 European Cultural Prize for Music, presented at the Dresden Frauenkirche in October 2015. Kallert started her career with WDR in 1995 as a television host for the German broadcaster, and has presented programmes including the German travel show, .

Jury members 
The list of jury members are as follows:
 Julian Rachlin (chairman) – Winner of the Eurovision Young Musicians 1988 representing Austria.
 Jonathan Cohen – artistic director and founder of the British early music ensemble Arcangelo.
 Tine Thing Helseth – Runner-up at the Eurovision Young Musicians 2006 representing Norway, and winner of the 2013 Echo Klassik Young Artist of the Year.
 Andreas Martin Hofmeir – Austrian tubist and winner of the 2013 Echo Klassik Instrumentalist of the Year. Also wrote the song "Nackert" performed by LaBrassBanda which finished in second place at Unser Song für Malmö, the national selection programme for Germany in the Eurovision Song Contest 2013.
 Alice Sara Ott – German-Japanese pianist and winner of the 2010 Echo Klassik Young Artist of the Year.

Participating countries 

The following countries participated in the 2016 contest. The semi final elimination stage of the contest was expected to return this year, with the first semi final scheduled to take place on 28 August 2016 and the second on 29 August, and the final on 3 September 2016. However the semi-finals were later removed due to the low number of participating countries. This year, only eleven countries participated in the contest.  made their debut at the Eurovision Young Musicians.

Finalists 
The Grand Final was held on 3 September 2016. Awards were given to the top three countries. The third-place musician received €3,000, second-place €7,000, and the winner €10,000 and a solo concert performance with the WDR Symphony Orchestra Cologne. The table below highlights these using gold, silver, and bronze. The placing results of the remaining participants is unknown and never made public by the European Broadcasting Union.

Broadcasting
The following countries, listed in order of broadcasting dates, confirmed that they will broadcast the contest along with the dates of broadcasting schedules.

Other countries
For a country to be eligible for potential participation in the Eurovision Young Musicians, it needs to be an active member of the European Broadcasting Union (EBU). It is unknown whether the EBU issue invitations of participation to all 56 active members like they do for the Eurovision Song Contest and Junior Eurovision Song Contest. The EBU Active Members listed below have made the following announcements in regards to their decisions.

Active EBU Members
 – On 20 October 2015, the Flemish broadcaster Vlaamse Radio- en Televisieomroeporganisatie (VRT) announced that they had no plans to return in 2016. Belgium last participated at the  Young Musicians event.
 – On 18 October 2015, Cyprus Broadcasting Corporation (CyBC) announced that they will not participate at the event. Cyprus last participated at the  Young Musicians event.
 – Greek broadcaster, Hellenic Broadcasting Corporation (ERT) withdrew from the 2016 edition, after last participating at the Eurovision Young Musicians 2014 with no reasons for their withdrawal being published.
 – On 19 October 2015, Israel Broadcasting Authority (IBA) announced that they will not participate at the event. Israel's last, and only, participation was at the  Young Musicians event.
 – On 15 October 2015, the Latvian broadcaster Latvijas Televīzija (LTV) announced that they would not take part in the 2016 event. Latvia last participated at the  Young Musicians event.
 – Moldavian broadcaster, TeleRadio-Moldova (TRM) withdrew from the 2016 edition, after last participating at the Eurovision Young Musicians 2014 with no reasons for their withdrawal being published.
 – Dutch broadcaster, Nederlandse Omroep Stichting (NOS) withdrew from the 2016 edition, after last participating at the Eurovision Young Musicians 2014 with no reasons for their withdrawal being published.
 – Portuguese broadcaster, Rádio e Televisão de Portugal (RTP) withdrew from the 2016 edition, after last participating at the Eurovision Young Musicians 2014 with no reasons for their withdrawal being published.
The following list of countries have participated at least once since the inaugural contest in  but have not stated their reasons for their continued absence in competing:

See also 

 Eurovision Song Contest 2016
 Junior Eurovision Song Contest 2016

References

External links 

 

2016 in German music
2016 in music
Eurovision Young Musicians by year
Music festivals in Germany
Events in Cologne
September 2016 events in Germany